Rajpura is located in Arwal, Bihar, India.

Rajpura has a total population of 863 people. There are about 165 houses in Rajpura village.

References 

Villages in Arwal district